The Malta Handball Association is the governing body of handball in Malta. It is affiliated to the International Handball Federation (IHF), the European Handball Federation and the Malta Olympic Committee (MOC). It is also registered with the Malta Sports Council (MSC). 

The MHA promotes handball and beach handball on the islands and administers the competitions. Six clubs are currently registered, being Aloysians HC, Kavallieri HC, La Salle HC, Luxol HC, Phoenix HC and HMS HC.

History 

The Malta Handball Association was founded in 1995, in 1999 the men's National team made its international debut in Cyprus during the first edition on the European Handball Federation Challenge Trophy. In the years 2003, 2009 and 2011, the Malta Handball Association organized the European Handball Federation Challenge Trophy.

In the season (2012/13), the association had a record of 39 registered teams and over 400 registered players taking part in the season's competitions.

References

External links
 

European Handball Federation
Handball
Handball in Malta
Sports organizations established in 1995